Orlando Vasquez may refer to:

 Orlando Vásquez (weightlifter, born 1969), Nicaraguan weightlifter
 Orlando Vasquez Morales (born 1997), Nicaraguan weightlifter